NPTA may refer to:

United States National Parent Teacher Association
National Postal Transport Association
National Paper Trade Association
National Progressive Taekwondo Association
National Property Taxpayers Association